Quader is a surname. Notable people with the surname include:

Ali Quader, Bangladesh Nationalist Party politician, former Member of Parliament
Frauke Quader, German-born Hyderabadi environmental activist
GM Quader (born 1948), Bangladeshi politician, chairperson of Jatiya Party
Manzur Quader, Bangladeshi politician, retired major of Bangladesh Army, former Member of Parliament
Obaidul Quader (born 1950), Bangladeshi politician, General Secretary of Bangladesh Awami League
Fazlul Quader Chowdhury (1919–1973), Bengali politician, speaker of the National Assembly of Pakistan from East Pakistan
Giasuddin Quader Chowdhury, Bangladesh Nationalist Party politician,
Salahuddin Quader Chowdhury (1949–2015), Bangladeshi politician, minister and six-term member of Jatiya Sangsad,
Abdul Quader Molla (1948–2013), Bangladeshi Islamist leader, convicted of war crimes and sentenced to death

de:Quader